Thomas Kerr may refer to:
Thomas Kerr of Ferniehirst (died 1585) Scottish landowner 
Thomas Kerr (illustrator) (born 1962), Canadian illustrator
Thomas Kerr (Kentucky politician) (born 1950), American politician and state legislator in Kentucky
Tom Kerr, British comic strip artist
 Tom Kerr (politician) (1887–1956), member of the Queensland Legislative Assembly
Stu Kerr (Thomas Stewart Kerr, 1928–1994), American television personality
T. Michael Kerr (born 1962), Assistant Secretary for Administration and Management at the U.S. Department of Labor
Thomas Kerr (writer and songwriter), Tyneside writer, journalist and songwriter of the middle and late 19th century
Thomas Kerr (engineer) (1924–2004), British aerospace engineer
Thomas R. Kerr (1843–1926), Irish-born Medal of Honor recipient for the American Civil War
Thomas Kerr (governor), governor of the Falkland Islands

See also
Thomas Kerr Fairless (1825–1853), English landscape-painter